South Atlantic Airways was an airline based in Santa Cruz de Tenerife, Canary Islands, Spain.

History
South Atlantic Airways was founded in 2000 as a Spanish-Russian venture. The company leased a plane from Israeli airline Arkia and began operating charter flights in March 2001. 

On 30 November 2001 South Atlantic Airways returned the leased plane to Arkia and ended all operations. The circumstances in which this airline operated and its activities were not clear and are rife with speculations.

Code data
ICAO Code: HRC (not current)

Fleet
1 Boeing 757

References

External links

Civil Aviation - South Atlantic Airways

Airlines established in 2000
Airlines disestablished in 2001
Defunct airlines of Spain
Transport in Tenerife